was a town located in Aida District, Okayama Prefecture, Japan.

As of October 2004, the town had an estimated population of 12,856 and a density of 147.82 persons per km². The total area was 86.97 km².

On March 31, 2005, Mimasaka absorbed the towns of Aida, Ōhara and Sakutō, the village of Higashiawakura (all from Aida District), and the town of Katsuta (from Katsuta District) to create the city of Mimasaka.

Geography

Adjoining municipalities
Okayama Prefecture
Shōō
Katsuta
Aida
Sakutō
Misaki

Education
Mimasaka-Daiichi Elementary School
Mimasaka-Kita Elementary School
Kose Elementary School (Closure in 2006)
Toyota Elementary School (Closure in 2003)
Mimasaka Junior High School
Okayama Prefectural Hayashino High School

Transportation

Railways
West Japan Railway Company
Kishin Line
Narahara Station - Hayashino Station

Road
Expressways:
Chūgoku Expressway
Narahara Parking Area - Mimasaka Interchange
National highways:
Route 179
Route 374
Prefectural roads:
Okayama Prefectural Route 51 (Mimasaka-Nagi)
Okayama Prefectural Route 349 (Kichigahara-Mimasaka)
Okayama Prefectural Route 354 (Mabashi-Hirafuku)
Okayama Prefectural Route 359 (Kashimura-Kanaya)
Okayama Prefectural Route 360 (Manzen-Mimasaka)
Okayama Prefectural Route 361 (Hataoki-Katsumada)
Okayama Prefectural Route 362 (Iden-Yūka)
Okayama Prefectural Route 379 (Dōdō-Kashimura)
Okayama Prefectural Route 388 (Magata-Mimasaka)
Roadside Station
Saisai Chaya

Notable places and events
Yunogo Onsen

External links
Official website of Mimasaka in Japanese

Dissolved municipalities of Okayama Prefecture
Mimasaka, Okayama